Common names: black asp, black viper.

Vipera aspis atra is a venomous viper subspecies endemic to France, Switzerland and Italy.

Geographic range
It is found in western Switzerland, northwestern Italy, Spain, and southeastern France. Mallow et al. (2003) describe the range only as "portions of Switzerland".

Conservation status
This subspecies is classified as Vulnerable (VU) according to the IUCN Red List of Threatened Species (v3.1, 2001).

Taxonomy
A recent study by Ursenbacher et al. (2006) suggests that V. a. atra may not be a valid subspecies.

References

Further reading

Meisner F. 1820. "12. Ueber die in der Schweiz einheimischen Schlangen überhaupt und die Vipern insbesonere." pp. 89–95. In: Museum der Naturgeschichte Helvetiens. Band I. Bern: Burgdorfer. 98 pp. (Vipera atra, pp. 93–94.)
 Ursenbacher S, Conelli A, Golay P, Monney JC, Zuffi MAL, Thiery G, Durand T, Fumagalli L. 2006. Phylogeography of the asp viper (Vipera aspis) inferred from mitochondrial DNA sequence data: Evidence for multiple Mediterranean refugial areas. Molecular Phylogenetics and Evolution 38 (2): 546-552.

aspis atra
Reptiles described in 1820